The 1933 Akron Zippers football team was an American football team that represented the University of Akron in the Ohio Athletic Conference during the 1933 college football season. In its seventh season under head coach Red Blair, the team compiled a 5–3–1 record (5–2–1 in conference) and outscored opponents by a total of 97 to 50. Wilson Sparhawk was the team captain.

Schedule

References

Akron
Akron Zips football seasons
Akron Zippers football